This is a list of museums in Brazil.

 Cabangu Museum
 Catete Palace
 Cultural Complex of the Republic
 Educational Museum Gama D'Eça
 Ema Gordon Klabin Cultural Foundation
 Eva Klabin Foundation
 Galeria de Artes Álvaro Santos
 House of the Seven Lamps
Ilha Fiscal
 Imperial Museum of Brazil
 Mariano Procópio Museum
 Museu Aeroespacial
 Museu de Arte de Ribeirão Preto
 Museu do Estado de Pernambuco
 Museu do Índio
 Museu Entomológico Fritz Plaumann
 Museum of Art of the Parliament of São Paulo
 Museum of Contemporary Art, University of São Paulo
 Museum of Life
 Museum of Modern Art of Bahia
 Museum of Science and Technology (PUCRS)
 Museum of the Portuguese Language
 Museum of Veterinary Anatomy FMVZ USP
 Museu Nacional de Belas Artes
 Museum Vincente Pallotti
 Museu Paulista
 Museu Rodin Bahia
 National Historical Museum (Brazil)
 National Museum of Brazil
 Niterói Contemporary Art Museum
 Pinacoteca do Estado de São Paulo
 Ricardo Brennand Institute
 São Paulo Museum of Art
 São Paulo Museum of Modern Art
 Santa Catarina Art Museum
 Schmitt-Presser Museum
 Wings of a Dream Museum

See also 
 List of archives in Brazil
 List of museums by country

Brazil
 
museum
Museums
Brazil